Phantom Tollbooth was a post-punk/noise rock band from New York City. They played a style of post punk that included elements from jazz,  noise rock, and art rock. This allowed Phantom Tollbooth to make sudden starts, stops, and tempo changes in their music.  All of their albums were released in a four-year window between 1984 and 1988 on Homestead Records. In 2003, Guided by Voices frontman Robert Pollard created new lyrics and melodies for Phantom Tollbooth's 1988 album Power Toy. The resulting work was released as Beard of Lightning.

Members
Dave Rick (guitar/vocals), is a former member of B.A.L.L., Bongwater, King Missile, Shapir-O'Rama, When People Were Shorter and Lived Near the Water, Wide Right, Wonderama, Yo La Tengo. He currently plays with Atlantic Drone, Dew-Claw, The Martinets, Overcat and Stress Test.
Gerard Smith (bassist), recently recorded with Ben Miller and his band Third Border on the album "Sun of Water, Sea of Light".  Produced by Roger Miller (Mission of Burma) and Laurence Miller (ex Destroy All Monsters), the album was a Grammy Award candidate for "Best Alternative Music Album of 2006."  In 2010, Smith played several dates with Doug Gillard (Guided By Voices/Death of Samantha) in the Doug Gillard Electric.
Jon Coats (drums), currently of Canartic and proprietor of Dank Disk records.

Records
Valley of the Gwangi 7" (1986)Phantom Tollbooth E.P. (1986)
One Way Conversation (1987) album cover designed by Dave's sister Jenny
Power Toy (1988)
Daylight in the Quiet Zone E.P. (1990)
Beard of Lightning (2003)

References

External links

Band Website

American post-punk music groups
American noise rock music groups
Homestead Records artists
Musical groups from New York City
Rock music groups from New York (state)